The Merrimack Athletics Complex is the home of the Merrimack College Warriors athletics teams.  It has a basketball court and hockey arena. Hammel Court, located in the Volpe Athletic Center,  is the home of the men's and women's basketball teams, as well as the volleyball team.  Lawler Rink is the home of the Division I Merrimack Warriors men's ice hockey team, which had won the 1978 Division II national title before transitioning to Division I and joining the prestigious Hockey East Conference.

The athletic center is named for S. Peter Volpe, a member of the college's Board of Trustees and benefactor.  His construction company was responsible for the building of the McQuaid Library on campus.  His brother, John Volpe, was U.S. Secretary of Transportation under President Richard M. Nixon.   The hockey arena is named for J. Thom Lawler, former coach of the men's hockey team who died in 1978 at age 44, just after leading the team to their first national title. The basketball and volleyball court is named after former men's basketball head coach Bert Hammel.

Over the summer and winter break of 2010, extensive renovation was done on the arena. The wooden bench seating was completely replaced with seatback chair seating and a student bleacher section was installed behind the visiting goalie's side. The "tin foil" insulation was removed from the roof as well. Seating capacity did decrease, however.

References

External links
 Merrimack Athletics Complex
 Lawler Rink
 Hammel Court

 

Basketball venues in Massachusetts
Buildings and structures in North Andover, Massachusetts
College basketball venues in the United States
College ice hockey venues in the United States
Indoor arenas in Massachusetts
Indoor ice hockey venues in Massachusetts
Merrimack College
Sports in Essex County, Massachusetts